Peter Mensah (born 27 August 1959) is a Ghanaian English actor, best known for his roles in the films Tears of the Sun, Hidalgo, The Incredible Hulk, 300, and television series such as Starz' Spartacus: Blood and Sand, Spartacus: Gods of the Arena, and Spartacus: Vengeance.

Early life
Mensah was born in Chiraa, Ghana, and comes from an academic family. He was born to parents from the Brong Ahafo Region, and moved to Hertfordshire, England, with his father, Peter Osei Mensah, an engineer, his mother, a writer, and two younger sisters at a young age. Mensah began practising martial arts at the age of six.

Career
Mensah's film credits include Avatar, 300, Hidalgo, Tears of the Sun, Jason X, Harvard Man, Bless the Child and The Incredible Hulk. He also stars in the short film The Seed, produced and directed by Linkin Park's DJ Joe Hahn. He has made television appearances in Star Trek: Enterprise, Tracker, Witchblade, Blue Murder, Relic Hunter, Earth: Final Conflict, Highlander: The Raven, and La Femme Nikita. He was a member of the repertory cast of the A&E Network series A Nero Wolfe Mystery and Terminator: The Sarah Connor Chronicles.

He voiced and provided his likeness for Sgt. Zach Hammond in EA's video game Dead Space.

Mensah played the character Oenomaus in Spartacus and was on the Spartacus Panel at Comic Con 2009 and 2011. He had a recurring role in the fifth season of True Blood.

He is the voice of Predaking, the dragon-like leader of the Predacons in Transformers: Prime.

Filmography

Film

Television

Video games

References

External links

1959 births
Living people
English expatriates in Canada
English male film actors
English male television actors
English male video game actors
English male voice actors
Ghanaian emigrants to England
Ghanaian male film actors
Ghanaian male television actors
Ghanaian male video game actors
Ghanaian male voice actors
People from Accra
People from Brong-Ahafo Region
Black British male actors
Male actors from Hertfordshire